Gerard Rennick (born 5 November 1970) is an Australian politician who has been a Senator for Queensland since July 2019. He is a member of the Liberal National Party of Queensland and sits with the Liberal Party in federal parliament.

Early life 
Rennick was born and raised on a property outside Chinchilla, on the Darling Downs. In his youth he worked as a farmhand, fruit picker, bartender and pump attendant.

He completed his education in Toowoomba at Downlands College, before moving to Brisbane, where he completed a Bachelor of Commerce degree at the University of Queensland. He also has a master's degree in Taxation Law from the University of Sydney and a master's degree in applied finance from FINSIA. He has 25 years’ experience in finance, both in Australia and overseas. He is married with three children.

Political career 
Rennick was first a candidate for the LNP in the 2016 Federal election in the senate. At that election he failed to win a seat

The Australian Broadcasting Corporation reported that Rennick donated $35,000 to the Liberal National Party (LNP) in the year before winning the third slot on the party's senate ticket—a position that eventually saw him elected to a six-year term. The LNP rejected as "offensive and ridiculous" any suggestion the donations played a role in his preselection, and highlighted the fact that some of their members self funded their elections.

During a speech on the Prohibiting Energy Market Misconduct Bill, he referred to Queensland Labor Senator Murray Watt as Labor's "chief yapping poodle."

On an interview on Sky News, Rennick spoke about government overreach in the "classroom and the bedroom" and compared it to a Communist takeover by the bureaucracy. When asked to clarify, Rennick said "there are ... groups within Australia, they are not Chinese groups, they are Australian groups, that seek to undermine our individual liberties and I think that is a greater threat to our sovereignty [than the Chinese government]."

Prior to the 2020 Queensland state election, The Guardian reported that Rennick had donated to anti-abortion group Cherish Life, which abortion clinic provider Marie Stopes Australia said was conducting a high-profile campaign of disinformation and "blatant lies".

Political positions 
Rennick is a member of the National Right faction of the Liberal Party.

Climate 
Rennick promotes climate change denial and has repeatedly accused the Australian government's Bureau of Meteorology (BOM) of falsifying climate data. He promoted conspiracy theories like that the bureau is tampering with climate data to "perpetuate global warming hysteria", as part of a "global warming agenda".

He has been viewed as a "right wing climate denialist" by the ALP, and was singled out by ALP leader Anthony Albanese as someone "who thinks the Bureau of Meteorology is part of global conspiracy". Groups that have also expressed that opinion include the Greens, the media, and some within the scientific community. Senator Murray Watt called Rennick's BOM allegations "nuts", adding that such allegations were sourced "from right-wing think tanks". Rennick said his view was based on his experience in accounting; he had not sought a briefing with the Bureau over his concerns.

Rennick proposed that the Kyoto carryover carbon credits should be used to support Australia's 2030 emissions target. Australia has been the only country in the world to attempt to use those credits, and was widely criticised for attempting to do so.

Rennick claimed that without anthropogenic carbon emissions, phytoplankton would absorb so much carbon from the atmosphere that it would "destroy our plant life", a hypothesis contradicted by the Earth's past history.

COVID-19 
In 2021, The Guardian reported that federal health minister Greg Hunt had described some of Rennick's Facebook posts as containing "false information". While the Guardian did not disclose what the posts said, it described them as "casting doubt over the accuracy of PCR tests", and said that he "questioned why Australia's Therapeutic Goods Administration (TGA) had not yet recommended use of ivermectin".

In November 2021, Rennick was one of five Liberal-aligned senators who voted against the government in support of One Nation's COVID‑19 Vaccination Status (Prevention of Discrimination) Bill 2021.

In December 2021, Rennick's claims that Covid-19 vaccines amounted to "experimenting" on children and his anti vaccine posts on Facebook were rebutted by multiple health officials. The Chief Medical Officer of Australia, Dr Paul Kelly, said that the Pfizer vaccine is “worthwhile, safe and effective” for children aged five to 11.  Head of the TGA, John Skerritt said “I reject the assertion that it’s nothing much for kids and doesn’t matter if they catch [Covid].” The Australian Medical Association vice-president, Chris Moy, told Guardian Australia that Rennick’s surveys of adverse events were “as far away from science as possible” because they “force one answer he wants”.

In February 2022, Rennick attended the Convoy to Canberra protests.

Superannuation 
On 13 November 2019 Rennick called superannuation a "cancer", saying: "Millions of dollars gets sucked out of the pockets of the battlers in the bush and sent to the blowhards in Sydney and Melbourne to manage, all for a small cost of around $37 billion a year in management fees." He said union-linked industry super funds were "laughing all the way to the bank" while no money was reinvested in regional areas. In the same speech he accused the Labor party of selling regional Australia "down the toilet" during the Hawke-Keating era through their globalist, privatisation agenda—selling off such government owned corporations as Qantas and the Commonwealth Bank of Australia. "Now regional Australia has to pay more for flying regionally than it costs to fly overseas ...The CBA, like every other bank in this country, became obsessed with housing rather than driving business and investment, especially in the regions."

Tax reform 
Rennick has used his background in finance to advocate tax reform. He called for profits in Australia to be taxed at the same rate as profits of foreign owned entities. He stated this could fund cuts to both payroll tax (a state based tax) and income tax.

Childcare 
He called Labor's policy of providing free childcare to all 3-year-olds in Australia a conspiracy "to strengthen the role the state has in raising a child at the expense of parents." Rennick's position is that "subject to financial considerations, if we can leave children at home with at least one parent, that's something worth striving for," but he suggested that "early childhood education is ... not the best way to invest in our future".

Foreign relations 
In September 2018 Rennick advocated closer ties with Russia because "they're part of the West; they drink, they're Christians, they play soccer, they're Caucasian". Rennick has called for deescalating tensions with Vladimir Putin and Russia; "They are a genuine superpower and it's not in the world's interest to have antagonistic relations with superpowers ... There's a bigger picture here and it is world peace."

Rennick raised doubts that Russia was behind the Skripal chemical weapons attack in the United Kingdom.

Rennick is a non-interventionist and has spoken out against regime change wars.

Immigration 
Rennick has compared Australia's immigration policy to farmers who "overstock [their] paddock", and has claimed that immigration was more damaging to Australia's environment than carbon pollution. He also wants a reduction in the number of temporary visa holders in Australia which numbers over 2 million.

Other positions 
Rennick has been a long term advocate of reforming the federation; government building and retaining profit making infrastructure such as dams, ports and electricity power plants; sustainable immigration to ensure quality of life for all Australians; higher taxes on profits sent offshore; and he has called on universities to underwrite the costs of education.

Rennick opposes the closing of maternity wards by the state government in regional Queensland and has called on the state government to improve maternity health outcomes.

Rennick is also opposed to the adoption of poker machines in the state of Queensland. He consequently has accused the Labor state government of being "utterly incompetent and morally corrupt".

He also spoke about having a constitutional convention to clearly define and separate the responsibilities of the Federal and State Governments in the federation: "It is time for COAG to hold a constitutional convention to clearly define and separate these responsibilities with proposed changes put to a referendum." There is no reference to a "constitutional convention" in the Australian constitution, and any such convention could do little more than recommend policy to be bought through to the normal referendum process.

References 

Liberal National Party of Queensland politicians
Living people
1970 births
People from the Darling Downs
Members of the Australian Senate for Queensland
Australian conspiracy theorists
University of Queensland alumni
University of Sydney alumni